City is a board game published in 1988 by Jumbo Games.

Contents
City is a game in which a small town has shops along the edge of the board and in the center, and points are scored from shoppers.

Reception
Brian Walker reviewed City for Games International magazine, and gave it 3 stars out of 5, and stated that "City fulfils much of the criteria required for a successful game; the luck element is a long way removed from the roll a dice and hope for the best school; the player interaction is strong and there is plenty of opportunity both for planning and decisions of an altogether more vindictive nature."

Review
Jeux & Stratégie #59

References

Board games introduced in 1988
Jumbo Games games